Raghunath Paleri (born 7 February 1954) is an Indian novelist, screenwriter, director and actor from Kerala.

Career
He has directed three filmsOnnu Muthal Poojyam Vare (1986), Vismayam (1998), and Kanneerinu Madhuram (unreleased); and in television, eight episodes of Bible Ki Kahaniya (1993–1995). He entered the Malayalam film industry in 1978 and has worked in Tamil film industry. 

His debut work with the producer Nirmal of Minerva Studio did not release at that time. Later Nirmal produced another film Naseema which got released in 1983 was written by Paleri. He found his way in acting as Adruman, a blind man, in Thottappan directed by Shanavas K. Bhavakutty.

Filmography

In print media 

Raghunath Paleri has authored several books in Malayalam language. His published works include:
Ananda Vedam
Vismayam Pole
Etho Rathriyude Pakal
Arundhathiyude Nagarathil
Akasathekkoru Jalakam
Avasyamillatha Achanammamar
Orkkunnuvo En Krishnaye
Raghunath Paleriyude Kathakal (short stories by Raghunath Paleri)
Sooryagayathri
Avar Moovarum Oru Mazhavillum
Onnu Muthal Poojyam Vare
Ponumuttayidunna Tharavu
Kanneerinu Madhuram
Ezham Nilayile Aakasham
Paleri Puranam
Aaltharayile Nilavettangal

Awards
 2021: Kendra Sahitya Akademi Award for Children's Literature for Avar Moovarum Oru Mazhavillum
 2021: Kerala Sahitya Akademi Award for Children's Literature for Avar Moovarum Oru Mazhavillum

References

External links 

Books Published by Mathrubhumi

1954 births
Kerala State Film Award winners
Living people
Malayalam film directors
Malayalam screenwriters
Malayalam novelists
Indian male novelists
Screenwriters from Kerala
20th-century Indian novelists
Novelists from Kerala
20th-century Indian male writers
Malayalam-language writers
Recipients of the Kerala Sahitya Akademi Award